A special election for Florida's 40th Senate district took place on September 26, 2017 to fill a vacancy.  Democrat Annette Taddeo defeated Republican Jose Felix Diaz, with approximately 23,000 votes to 21,000.

The vacancy had been caused by Republican Senator Frank Artiles's resignation on April 21, 2017 after he unleashed a tirade of racist and sexist remarks to two African-American senators.

Primaries
Primary elections took place on July 25, 2017.

Republican primary
127 of 138 Precincts Reporting

Democratic primary
127 of 138 Precincts Reporting

General Special Election

Results

References

2017 Florida elections